Jonah H. Peretti (born January 1, 1974) is an Internet entrepreneur, a co-founder and the CEO of BuzzFeed, co-founder of The Huffington Post, and developer of reblogging under the project "Reblog".

Education and early career
Peretti was born in California and raised in Oakland, California. His father, a criminal defense lawyer and painter, is of Italian and English descent and his mother (née Cherkin), a schoolteacher, is Jewish. His stepmother was African-American. He attended The College Preparatory School in Oakland, followed by the University of California, Santa Cruz, where he graduated with a degree in environmental studies in 1996. He taught computer science classes at Isidore Newman School in New Orleans, in the mid-1990s. He received a master's degree from the MIT Media Lab in 2001.

While at MIT, his email exchange with Nike over a request to print "sweatshop" on custom order shoes went viral.

In 2013, it came to light that after graduating from the University of California, Santa Cruz in 1996, Peretti published an article titled "Capitalism and Schizophrenia" in Negations, a Texas-based journal of critical theory. The paper demonstrated the "psychological link between one-dimensionality and advertising".

Career
Peretti co-founded The Huffington Post along with Kenneth Lerer, Andrew Breitbart and Arianna Huffington in 2005. He left The Huffington Post in 2011 after it was bought by AOL for $315 million.

In 2005, Peretti hosted the Contagious Media Showdown at Eyebeam in New York City, where he worked as director of the R&D Lab from 2001 to 2006. During the process Peretti developed the concept of the "Bored-at-Work Network", which he supposes to be larger than some major television network audiences.

Peretti founded the "Internet popularity contest" site BuzzFeed in November 2006. After leaving The Huffington Post, Peretti began working at BuzzFeed full-time. While originally known for its mix of internet memes and listicles, the site was the first to break the news that John McCain would endorse Mitt Romney in the 2012 Republican Primary. The site continued to grow afterward, raising over $35 million in funding from investors the next year. In August 2014, the site raised another $50 million from the venture capital firm Andreessen Horowitz, more than doubling its previous rounds of funding. The site was valued at $850 million by Andreessen Horowitz.

In 2019, Peretti announced that BuzzFeed would be cutting its overall workforce by 15 percent. Peretti said he wanted to reduce costs without resorting to additional fundraising. Its remaining workforce then officially unionized, their first successful fight being over laid-off staffers getting their earned paid time off.

In 2021 at a virtual company meeting, Peretti, as BuzzFeed's chief executive, fired 47 employees at HuffPost in a controversial manner, sending a virtual meeting password "spr!ngisH3r3" to laid-off employees.

The HuffPost Union, which is affiliated with the Writers Guild of America East, said in a statement that the layoffs had affected 33 of its members, nearly a third of the local union.

Under Peretti's leadership, Buzzfeed has lost about $10 million annually.

Personal life
He is the elder brother of comedian, actress and writer Chelsea Peretti. He is married to blogger Andrea Harner, with whom he has twin sons.

References

1974 births
American Internet celebrities
Living people
American people of Italian descent
American people of Jewish descent
American people of English descent
Massachusetts Institute of Technology alumni
21st-century American businesspeople
University of California, Santa Cruz alumni
HuffPost
American media executives
BuzzFeed people